Dondușeni is a city in the north of Moldova. It is the administrative, economic, and cultural center of Dondușeni District. Its postal code is MD-5102. The population at the 2004 census was 9,801.

Demographics 

At the 1930 census, the locality (then a village) was known as Dondoșani-Gară (literally Dondoșani Station), and had a population of 953. It was part of Plasa Climăuți of Soroca County.

There are three high schools in Donduşeni, one Romanian, the Alexei Mateevici Lyceum, and two Russian.

Dondușeni has a hospital, a hotel, a police office, some cafes and restaurants.

Media
 Vocea Basarabiei 104.4 FM

Notable people
 Simion Galețchi
 Dorin Recean

Bibliography
Veaceslav Ioniță, Ghidul orașelor din Republica Moldova/ Veaceslav Ioniță. Igor Munteanu, Irina Beregoi. Chișinău: TISH, 2004 (F.E.-P. Tipografia Centrală). 248 p.

References

Cities and towns in Moldova
Dondușeni District
Moldova articles needing attention